The Creation of the Universe is an album by Lou Reed's Metal Machine Trio. The trio was formed in 2008 with Ulrich Krieger and Sarth Calhoun to play music inspired by Reed's 1975 album Metal Machine Music. The first concerts of the group were on October 2 and 3, 2008, at REDCAT in Los Angeles. The group was named Metal Machine Trio only after these concerts. The concert itself was announced as Lou Reed and Ulrich Krieger: Unclassified. The CD is the unedited live recording of both nights. It is available in a variety of formats from Lou Reed's website including, MP3, FLAC, 2 Disk CD and Deluxe CD. Cover and inlay photos are by Lou Reed.

The music on both CDs is freely improvised and without vocals and song structures. It ranges from dark ambient passages to noise, free rock and electronica.

Track listing
"Night 1" – 54:57
"Night 2" – 55:49

Personnel
Lou Reed – guitars, electrics
Ulrich Krieger – tenor saxophone, live-electronics
Sarth Calhoun – Continuum fingerboard, live processing

References

External links
 Loureed.com

Lou Reed live albums
2008 live albums